The rupiah (symbol: Rp; currency code: IDR) is the official currency of Indonesia. It is issued and controlled by Bank Indonesia. The name "rupiah" is derived from the Sanskrit word for silver, . Sometimes, Indonesians also informally use the word  ("silver" in Indonesian) in referring to rupiah in coins. The rupiah is divided into 100 sen, although high inflation has rendered all coins and banknotes denominated in  obsolete.

Introduced in 1946 by Indonesian nationalists fighting for independence, the currency replaced a version of the Netherlands Indies gulden, which had been introduced during the Japanese occupation in World War II. In its early years, the rupiah was used in conjunction with other currencies, including a new version of the gulden introduced by the Dutch. The Riau Islands and the Indonesian half of New Guinea (Irian Barat) had their own variants of the rupiah in the past, but these were subsumed into the national rupiah in 1964 and 1971, respectively (see Riau rupiah and West Irian rupiah).

Redenomination 
A long-running proposal to redenominate the rupiah has yet to receive formal legislative consideration. Since 2010, Bank Indonesia, as the monetary authority of Indonesia, has repeatedly urged the elimination of the final three zeroes of the currency, to facilitate transaction handling, saying the move would not affect its value. In 2015, the government submitted a rupiah redenomination bill to the House of Representatives, but it has not yet been deliberated. In 2017, Bank Indonesia Governor Agus Martowardojo reiterated the call, saying that if redenomination started immediately, the process could be complete by 2024 or 2025.

Current legal tender 
The current rupiah consists of coins from Rp50 up to Rp1,000 (Rp1 coins officially remain legal tender, but are effectively worthless and are not encountered in circulation) and banknotes of Rp1,000 up to Rp100,000. With US$1 worth Rp14,899.25 as of 2 Sept 2022, the largest Indonesian banknote is, therefore, worth about US$6.71.

Coins 

Presently, two series of coins are in circulation: aluminium and nickel coins dated between 1999, 2003, 2010, and a new series of coins featuring Indonesia's national heroes was issued in 2016. These come in denominations of Rp100, Rp200, Rp500, and Rp1000. The older series of coins has been gradually disappearing. Due to the low value and general shortage of small-denomination coins (below 100 rupiah), amounts are commonly rounded up (or down) or sweets are received in lieu of the last few rupiah of change in supermarkets and stores.

Banknotes 

Currently circulating Indonesian banknotes date from 2000 (Rp1,000), 2001 (Rp5,000), 2004 (Rp20,000 and Rp100,000), 2005 (Rp10,000 and Rp50,000), 2009 (the new denomination of Rp2.000), 2010 (revised version of the Rp10,000), 2011 (revised versions of the Rp20,000, Rp50,000 and Rp100,000) and 2020 (the commemorative Rp75,000 denomination issued 2020). Notes issued in 1998–1999 ceased to be legal tender since 31 December 2008 and were exchangeable until 30 December 2018 at Bank Indonesia. Earlier notes are also no longer legal tender, due to the lack of security features and association with the Suharto regime (especially 1993 and 1995 note of the 50,000 rupiah), but could be exchanged in Bank Indonesia offices until 20 August 2010.

As the smallest current note is worth approximately US$0.067, even small transactions such as bus fares are typically conducted with notes and the Rp1,000 coin is far more common than the Rp1,000 note. The government initially announced that this would change, with a Rp2,000 note to replace the Rp1,000, with that denomination fully replaced by the equivalent coin. After a long delay, this proposal was revised so that the Rp2,000 banknotes were launched by Bank Indonesia (BI) on 9 July 2009, with the banknotes circulating as legal tender from 10 July 2009, but without withdrawing the 1,000-rupiah note.

Due to the low value of the (older series) notes below Rp1,000, although they are no longer being circulated, some remain in use in increasingly poor condition, as low denomination uang pasar (literally "market money"), outside the banking system for use in informal transactions.

Following the issuance of Presidential Decree No. 31 of 5 September 2016, BI introduced seven new banknote designs featuring national heroes:

2016 series

2022 series 
Bank Indonesia introduced a new family of banknotes on 18 August 2022. Officially they were retroactively issued as legal tender on 17 August 2022 to commemorate the 77th Independence Day of Indonesia. Similar to the 2016 series, the Indonesian dances and national heroes are still featured on the notes, with some notable changes.

Security features 

 The basic materials of the banknotes is cotton fiber, because it is more flexible and not easily ripped. However, the preferable material is abacá, which is naturally plentiful in Indonesia, especially in the Talaud Islands. and is believed to increase the durability of the banknotes. In 2014, Bank Indonesia planned to use this material, but in the 2016 series, decided to print using paper which was also used to print banknotes from previous editions.
 The minimum security features visible to the naked eye are watermarks, electrotypes and security threads with colour fibres. Extra features may be included, such as holograms, Irisafe, iridescent stripes, clear windows, metameric windows and gold patches.
 Watermark and electrotype are made by controlling the gap of density of the fibres, which create certain images for the banknotes. This is done to raise the aesthetic quality of the notes.
 Security threads are inserted into the note so that horizontal and vertical lines are shown from top to bottom. The threads can be varied in materials, size, colour and design.
 Intaglio printing is used for the denomination numbers in the banknote, to help blind people recognise genuine notes and their denomination.
 The 2010 and 2011 revised-2004/2005 note series of Rp10,000, Rp20,000, Rp50,000 and Rp100,000 introduced several new security features: use of EURion constellation rings, rainbow printing designed to change colour when viewed from different angles and tactile features for blind people and those with visual difficulties to recognise the different denominations of the notes.

Digital rupiah 
Bank Indonesia initiated the Garuda Project, a project to develop Indonesia's central bank digital currency on 30 November 2022. through a white paper on its development. By passage of the omnibus law, the digital rupiah is legalised as a form of the rupiah.

History 

During colonial times, the currency used in what is now Indonesia was the Netherlands Indies gulden. The country was invaded in 1942 by Japan, which began printing its own version of the gulden, which remained in use until March 1946. The Netherlands authorities and the Indonesian nationalists, who were fighting for independence, both introduced rival currencies in 1946 with the Dutch printing a new gulden, and the Indonesians issuing the first version of the rupiah on 3 October 1946. Between 1946 and 1950 a large number of currencies circulated in Indonesia, with the Japanese gulden still remaining prevalent alongside the two new currencies and various local variants. This situation ended when the federal government, now in complete control following the Dutch recognition of its independence, initiated currency reforms between 1950 and 1951. The rupiah was declared the sole legal currency, with other currencies being exchanged for rupiah at rates which were often unfavourable to the holders.

Exchange rate and inflation 
The rupiah has been subject to high inflation for most of its existence (which as an internationally recognised currency should be dated to 1950). Various attempts have been made to maintain the value of the currency, but all were abandoned.

1946–1949 revolutionary period 
In the period from October 1946 to March 1950, Indonesian currency had no international recognition. Its value was determined on the black market.

1949–1965 foreign exchange restrictions 
The exchange rate determined upon independence in 1949 was Rp3.8 to US$1. Lembaga Alat-Alat Pembayaran Luar Negeri Publication No. 26 on 11 March 1950 (effective 13 March 1950) established the Foreign Exchange Certificate System (FECS). By the trade-in certificates an export rate of Rp7.6 and an import rate of Rp11.4 was established.

The FECS was scrapped on 4 January 1952, by which time the government had been able to reduce its deficit by 5.3 billion rupiah through the exchange differential. The system was scrapped because domestic prices were being determined by the import rate, which were hurting profits from exports earned at the lower rate. Hence, the effective Rp7.6/11.4 exchange rate reverted to Rp3.8.

The ending of what amounted to an export tariff severely damaged government revenues, and as of 4 February 1952, the rupiah was officially devalued to Rp11.4, with export tariffs of 15–25% on commodities in which Indonesia was strong. Weaker commodities were not subject to tariffs, and from 1955 were actually given a premium of 5–25% to boost their export.

To control foreign exchange, the government brought in a number of measures. About 40% of the foreign-exchange requirements of importers were required to be paid to the government from April 1952, while as from September 1952, the government decided to provide only a limited amount of foreign exchange, made available every four months. These foreign-exchange restrictions, designed to provide the government with much-needed reserves, meant that some companies were operating at as low as 20% of capacity, due to lack of needed imported materials.

Further foreign-exchange restrictions were introduced over 1953–1954, with April 1953, the foreign-exchange downpayment was increased to 75%, except for raw materials at 50%. Foreign companies and their workers were placed under restrictions as to the amount of foreign exchange that could be sent home, with the amounts allowed out subject to fees of %. As of November 1954, exporters were required to sell 15% of their foreign exchange earned to the government.

An increasingly complex set of tariffs on imports was unified in September 1955 with a set of extra import duties, requiring down payments to the government of 50, 100, 200, or 400% of the value of the goods.

The official Rp11.4 rate, which massively overvalued the rupiah, was a major incentive to black-market traders, and also contributed to anti-Java feeling, given that those producing raw materials on the large material-rich outer islands were not receiving fair value from their goods due to the exchange rate, diverting funds to the government in Java. The black-market rate at the end of 1956 was Rp31 to US$1, falling to Rp49 at the end of 1957, and Rp90 by the end of 1958.

In response to Sumatra and Sulawesi refusing to hand over their foreign exchange, in June 1957, a new system for foreign exchange was introduced; exporters received export certificates (BE) representing the foreign currency earned and could sell them to importers on the free market (but subject to a 20% tax). This effectively created a freely floating rupiah. The price of the certificates quickly reached 332% of face value by April 1958, i.e. Rp38, a rate at which the government chose to end the free market, fixing the price at 332% of face value.

The currency devaluation of large notes in 1959 had the official exchange rate devalued to Rp45 as of August 1959. Despite this, the fundamental issues with the fixed-exchange-rate system and severe import controls (which had cotton mills running at only 11% of capacity due to lack of imported raw materials) were not addressed, and smuggling grew, often backed by the army, while assets were moved offshore by over-invoicing.

The government maintained price controls over goods and raw materials, with the official oil price unchanged from 1950 to 1965.

After the 1959 devaluation, inflation, which had been running at 25% per annum 1953–1959, grew exponentially, with rates over 100% in 1962, 1963, and 1964, and 600% in 1965. Despite the official Rp45 to US$1 rate, two further export certificate trading systems, of March 1962 – May 1963, and then from April 1964 onwards, showed premiums of 2,678% July 1962 (an effective rate of Rp1,205), 5,100% August 1965 (Rp2,295) and 11,100% in November 1965 (Rp4,995).

1966–1971 stabilisation and growth 
The last demonetisation of rupiah notes occurred in late 1965 when inflation was ravaging the economy: exports had dropped 24% in 1959–1965, GDP growth was below population growth, and the foreign exchange reserves had fallen by over 90%. Inflation in 1965 was 635%. In late 1965, the 'new rupiah' was brought in, at 1 new rupiah to 1,000 old rupiah. The official exchange rate was set initially at Rp0.25 to US$1 as of 13 December 1965, a rate that did not represent reality, as the multiple exchange-rate system remained in place for the time being.

This was followed by the emergence of Suharto, who as of 11 March 1966, acquired executive control of Indonesia.

Suharto quickly made economic changes, establishing his "New Order", with the economic policy set by the Berkeley Mafia, his team of US-educated neoclassical economists. The policy began to be set out in November 1966, following the reaching of agreement with Indonesia's creditors in October 1966 on debt relief and loan restructuring. Economic policies were put in place to require adequate bank reserves, ending subsidies on consumer goods, end import restrictions, and to devalue the rupiah.

The 1966–1970 stabilisation program was a great success, resulting in higher economic growth, boosting legal exports (which grew 70% in US$ terms over the period), and increasing output (for instance the price of oil rose 250 times when the 1950 prices were abandoned, incentivising new exploration). By 1971, inflation had fallen to just 2%.

Despite the liberalisation efforts, Indonesia still had multiple exchange rates. A more realistic exchange rate was finally established of 378 (new) rupiah to US$1 as of April 1970. In August 1971, the exchange rate was devalued slightly, to Rp415 to US$1.

Fixed rate period 1971–1978 

The exchange rate of 415 rupiah to the US dollar, which had been established in August 1971, was maintained by government intervention in the currency market, buying and selling currency as needed.

Despite the fixed exchange rate, the failure of the rice crop in 1972, exacerbated by high world rice prices and underordering by the government rice cartel, along with rising commodity prices, caused inflation to rise above 20% in 1972, peaking at over 40% in 1974. The M1 money supply increased sharply over the period due to lax credit controls, which was channelled towards favoured groups, such as pribumi, as well as corrupt government-linked businesses.

Despite the high inflation of the period, the exchange rate, which had essentially been preserved using the country's oil exports, was maintained at Rp415 until 15 November 1978.

Managed float period 1978–1997

1978–1986 devaluations 
By 1978, the combination of a fall in oil prices and a decrease in foreign reserves meant that the rupiah was devalued 33% to Rp. 625 to US$1 on 16 November 1978 (although prices had increased nearly fourfold over the period).

The government abandoned the fixed exchange rate, and altered economic policy to a form of a managed float. The exchange rate was published each day. At the point of devaluation (November 1978), the trade-weighted real (local price adjusted) effective exchange rate of the rupiah against major world currencies was just over twice as high as it was in 1995 (prior to the Asian economic crisis, and free fall of the rupiah), i.e. the rupiah was highly overvalued at this point. By March 1983, the managed float had brought only an 11% fall in three and a half years to Rp702.

The continued overvaluation of the rupiah meant that Indonesia was beginning to suffer a trade deficit, as well as falling foreign exchange reserves. The government responded by devaluing the currency on 30 March by 28% to Rp970.

At this time, the 1980s oil glut put the Indonesian economy under pressure, with exports uncompetitive as a result of the overvalued currency, and oil contributing less as a result of lower global prices. On 1 June 1983, 'Pakjun 1983' brought deregulation of the banking system, and the end of the meaningless 6% official deposit rate, with a more market-based financial system. Credit ceilings were removed. Interest rates, initially 18%, remained above 15% over the period.

By September 1986, the currency had been allowed to steadily fall to 1,134 rupiah, a rate which had largely maintained purchasing power over the period. Despite this, the currency was devalued 30% on 12 September 1986 to 1,664 rupiah to US$1. As in 1983, this had been intended to boost the balance of trade: oil prices, US$29 in 1983, fell by 50% in 1986 alone, to below US$9 per barrel.

Thus, in the period from 1978 to 1986, the real exchange rate of the Indonesian rupiah fell by more than 50%, providing significant boosts to the competitiveness of Indonesia's exports.

October 1986 – June 1997: US$ real exchange parity 

Although the devaluations of 1978, 1983, and 1986 had each successfully boosted the competitiveness of exports, devaluations have a destabilising effect, and the September 1986 devaluation was the last carried out by Indonesia.

According to research, despite an official seven-currency exchange basket, empirical evidence suggests that the rupiah was controlled by BI against the US$ alone, and indeed since the 1986 devaluation, the currency maintained near-constant purchasing power against the dollar until the 1997 crisis, the steady fall of the rupiah against the dollar essentially representing the difference between Indonesian inflation and US inflation; hence, by June 1997, the rupiah had fallen from its post-evaluation rate of Rp1,664 to Rp2,350, an annualized decline slightly over 3%.

Asian financial crisis (and response) 1997–1999

First stage of the crisis – limited initial falls 
The Asian financial crisis of 1997 began in Thailand in May 1997, where the government found it harder to maintain the Thai baht peg at ฿25 to US$1. By 2 July 1997, Thailand abandoned its defence of the baht, allowing it to float freely. Indonesia, which had massive foreign reserves and was seen as having a strong economy, responded on 11 July 1997, by widening its exchange rate band from 8 to 12%. Indonesia had taken similar actions in the years leading up to the crisis, in December 1995 from 2 to 3%, in response to the Mexican financial crisis, and in June and September 1996, from 3 to 5% and then 5 to 8%. These actions had been successful in the past in defending the rupiah, but on this occasion, a more serious crisis of confidence arose.

The rupiah immediately fell 7%, with foreign money quickly leaving the country. The investor confidence in Indonesia was shaken, and due to previous deregulations, much of the Indonesian stock market was owned by foreign investors. Local confidence in the currency was also undermined as the population followed suit, selling rupiah for dollars. The spot rate soon fell below the selling rate (i.e. outside the 12% exchange rate band). BI attempted to intervene but eventually abandoned the managed float on 14 August 1997, leaving the rupiah to float freely. The rupiah–dollar rate was at Rp2,436 to one dollar on 11 July. It fell to Rp2,663 by 14 August and Rp2,955 by 15 August – a 122% fall. Government debt (Bank Indonesia Certificates or SBI) rose from 12% to 30%, and overnight call rates reached 81% (per annum).

Response to the falls – crisis 
At this stage, the crisis was a limited one; while the currency had fallen, the extent of the fall did not appear catastrophic. The government announced its response in September, calling for the restructuring of the banking sector, cancellation of government projects, and supporting some banks with their own liquidity. The SBI rate was reduced three times in September to around 20%. As of 24 September, the exchange rate still lingered at Rp. 2,990 per dollar.

The government response to the crisis sent mixed messages, with falling interest rates doing nothing to support confidence in the rupiah, and the rupiah continued to be sold, as companies that had been borrowing heavily in dollars had to meet their obligation. By 4 October, the currency had collapsed a further 19%, falling to Rp3,690 per dollar. It had now lost a third of its value, and now a full-blown 'crisis' existed in Indonesia.

On 8 October with the rupiah at Rp3,640 per dollar, the government decided to seek the support of the International Monetary Fund. During the month, the rupiah fluctuated in the Rp3,300–3,650 range. IMF's response was announced on 1 November 1997. Sixteen small and insolvent banks, holding a market share of 2.5%, would be closed. Private banks would be subject to improved monitoring, and some state banks would be merged. Deposits would be underwritten up to Rp20 million (about US$5,500). About 90% of all depositors held less than this amount in their bank accounts.

After this announcement, the rupiah immediately gained almost 10%, to around Rp3,300 per dollar. Soon after, however, confidence began to fall. The IMF response had only been published in summary form from the government and BI, the choice of the 16 banks being closed appeared arbitrary, and the details of the 34 others subject to special measures were not announced. The deposit guarantee was seen as inadequate, and funds were moved from private to state banks, exchanged for dollars, or transferred offshore, as confidence in the plan began to evaporate.

The rupiah steadily weakened from the middle of November, standing at Rp3,700 per dollar at the end of the month. In December, the crisis turned into a disaster. Much of the Indonesian economy was controlled by relatives of President Suharto, and of the 16 banks to be liquidated, 25% of PT Bank Andromeda was owned by Bambang Trihatmodjo, the second son of Suharto, PT Bank Jakarta was part-owned by Probosutedjo, the President's half-brother and 8% of PT Bank Industri was owned by the President's second daughter, Siti Hediati Prabowo.

The President and his family were opposed to the reforms, with Bambang Trihatmodjo beginning legal action against the government to keep his bank, particularly as directors of the insolvent banks were, if culpable, to be added to a Disgraced person's List, ineligible to work in the banking sector. Although the bank had violated its BMPK (credit limit), Bambang was given permission by BI to buy Bank Alfa, another bank, seen by many as a reward for withdrawing his lawsuit. In effect, the failed bank was reopened under a different name.

Cronyism and corruption of Indonesia clearly were winning over IMF reforms. The rupiah fell from Rp4,085 to Rp5,650 per dollar in the space of a single week. By the middle of the month, 154 banks, comprising half of the banking system, had suffered bank runs. By Christmas Eve, the rupiah stood at 5,915 per dollar, a fall of 60% since July.

The New Year had the rupiah begin at Rp5,447 per dollar. On 15 January, the second letter of intent was signed with the IMF, agreeing an accelerated reform package in return for US$43 billion of aid. The rupiah had strengthened from an all-time low of Rp9,100 per dollar on 23 January to Rp. 7,225 per dollar on 15 January. However, as it became clear Suharto had no intention of fulfilling the agreement, the rupiah plummeted by more than 50%, bottoming out at Rp14,800 per dollar on 23 January. By now, the government had issued more than Rp60 trillion, causing money supply increases and worsening inflation.

The government announced a rescue package on 26 January, ensuring that it would guarantee all existing deposits. The Indonesian Bank Restructuring Agency was set up with the goal of merging, closing, or recapitalising (before sale) banks. Four state and 50 private banks, representing nearly 40% of the sector, were placed under IBRA supervision in February 1998, resulting in the rupiah strengthening to 7,400 per dollar.

Despite the improvements, political instability quickly increased. The currency fell to around Rp10,000 per dollar.

Indonesian government began to take more drastic action, doubling its SBI rates to 45% (increasing the cost of its lending), and in April, has signed a third letter of intent with the IMF, the IBRA took over the major private banks, twinning the banks with state banks, and suspending the owners' control. The rupiah, which had strengthened to around Rp8,000, depreciated in the wake of the Jakarta riots of May 1998, and in particular the run on the Bank Central Asia, Indonesia's largest private bank, that ensued, causing the bank to be taken over by IBRA on 29 May. The SBI rate was increased to 70% in the wake of massive inflation.

The end of Suharto's rule brought a new president, B. J. Habibie, to power on 21 May 1998. Little action was seen immediately, and by 17 June, the rupiah had bottomed out at Rp16,800 per dollar. On 25 June 1998, the fourth letter of intent was signed with the IMF, which was refusing to provide aid due to breaches of its original agreement. The IMF agreed to provide an immediate US$5 billion of aid to cover basic necessities.

Audits of the banks that had been taken over showed massive bad debts, exceeding 55%. Further audits showed that the other banks were also fundamentally weak. Banking reform continued throughout 1999, with the merger of four state banks in July 1999 into Bank Mandiri, the closure of 38 banks, recapitalisation of nine, and takeover of seven more in March 1999. By this point, the total bank capital had reached a negative 245 trillion rupiah. Twenty-three further banks were recapitalised in May, and in October 1999, Bank Mandiri itself was recapitalised. Interest rates fell steadily in 1999, to an SBI of 13.1% in October. The rupiah finished the year at Rp7,900 to the US dollar.

Despite the fall of the currency of about 70% from June 1997 to December 1998, inflation of 60–70% in 1998 (which caused riots and the end of the Suharto regime after 30 years in power) meant that the real exchange rate fell only slightly.

Rupiah since 1999: relative stability 

The rupiah declined from its relatively strengthened position at the end of the financial crisis, with the rupiah seeing the start of 2000 at Rp7,050 to the US dollar, but declining to Rp9,725 by the end of 2000, and reaching a low of Rp12,069 on 27 April 2001. The currency strengthened to Rp8,500 later in 2001 but ended 2001 at Rp10,505. March 2002 had the currency break below Rp10,000, from which point the currency maintained a rate in the Rp8,000s and Rp9,000s until August 2005, and in the latter half of that year, the trading range extended towards Rp11,000, but ending the year just below Rp10,000. In 2006 and 2007, the currency trade was in a relatively narrow range against the US dollar (which itself was depreciating against other currencies), of Rp8,500–9,900. This trend continued into 2008, with the currency trading between Rp9,000 and Rp9,500.

The financial crisis of 2007–2008 with the collapse in the commodities market had the US$ gain strongly against currencies backed by weakening commodities exports. With palm oil and rubber prices falling from their peak by more than half, the rupiah came under pressure, Bank Indonesia spent US$7 billion of its US$57 billion reserves in October defending the currency. Despite this, the rupiah slipped below Rp10,000 on 23 October for the first time since 2005, and then below Rp11,000 on 2 November, a mark last reached in 2001. On 13 November, BI introduced new regulations requiring foreign currency purchases over US$100,000 a month to be backed by documentation of an underlying transaction and a tax number. The rupiah closed below Rp12,000 for the first time since 1998 on 20 October, with intraday lows below Rp13,000. Subsequently, however, the cut in the Federal Reserve rate to 0–0.25% and BI support for the currency, had the rupiah strengthen slightly to a range around Rp11,000.

The catastrophic damage to the rupiah caused in 1997–1998 severely damaged confidence in the currency. Though the rupiah is a freely convertible currency, it is still regarded as a risky currency to hold. As of September 2018, the rupiah had fallen to its weakest position since the 1998 crisis with one US dollar being worth roughly Rp14,880, peaking at Rp. 15,009 on 4 September. By the time COVID-19 pandemic hit the country in March 2020, it fell even further to nearly Rp. 16,650, nearly reaching the 1998 crisis value, although it recovered as the year progressed. It is one of the least valued currency units in the world, after the Venezuelan bolivar, Iranian rial and Vietnamese đồng.

See also 
 Economy of Indonesia
 Netherlands Indies gulden
 Netherlands New Guinean gulden
 Riau rupiah
 West Irian rupiah

References

Citations

General sources 
 
 
 Cribb, Robert, "Political dimensions of the currency question 1945–1947", Indonesia 31 (April 1981), pp. 113–136.

External links 

 Daily rupiah exchange rates from other currencies  (Bank Indonesia rates)
 Historical and current banknotes of Indonesia

 
Currencies introduced in 1946
Currencies of Indonesia
Currency symbols